Stuart Beattie may refer to:

 Stuart Beattie (born 1972), Australian screenwriter and film director
 Stuart Beattie (footballer) (born 1967), Scottish footballer who played for Rangers F.C..